Neighbours is an Australian television soap opera that was first broadcast on 18 March 1985. The following is a list of characters that first appeared in the serial in 1986, by order of first appearance. All characters were introduced by the show's executive producer Reg Watson. The 2nd season of Neighbours began airing from 20 January 1986. The episode marked the first appearances of Zoe Davis, Madge Mitchell and Mike Young. Clive Gibbons and Nikki Dennison also arrived in January. Rosemary Daniels began appearing from February, while Nikki's mother, Laura, made her debut in March. The following month saw the first appearances of Jack Lassiter, Charlene Mitchell and Nell Mangel. Madge's brother, Tom Ramsay, arrived in May and Sue Parker debuted in June. July saw the first appearances from Jane Harris and Sam Cole. Sam's mother, Susan, arrived the following month, along with Dan Ramsay. Ruth Wilson and Edna Ramsay debuted in September. Warren Murphy was introduced in October.

Zoe Davis

Zoe Davis, played by Ally Fowler, made her first screen appearance on 20 January 1986. Fowler joined the cast shortly after producers decided to add several new cast members, in a bid to improve the serial. Zoe is described as being "fickle and unpredictable to an incredible degree", she is also blunt with a sharp wit. Zoe was described by James Oram, author of Neighbours: Behind the scenes, as being "fickle and unpredictable to an incredible degree", she is blunt and has a sharp wit. Josephine Monroe, who wrote The Neighbours Programme Guide, noted that Zoe was both "charming and infuriating". Zoe was an old school friend of Daphne Lawrence (Elaine Smith) and she came to Erinsborough for her wedding to Des Clarke (Paul Keane). She later developed a relationship with the much older Jim Robinson (Alan Dale), which shocked the other Ramsay Street residents.

Madge Mitchell

Madge Mitchell, played by veteran actress Anne Charleston, made her first screen appearance on 20 January 1986. The character was introduced as Max Ramsay's (Francis Bell) elder sister. Max found Madge to be "formidable" and never won when she was around. Hilary Kingsley, author of Soap Box, stated that Madge was "loud, but likeable, meddlesome but cuddlesome, she has an opinion on everyone, ridiculous often but usually right." Madge went back to using her maiden name to avoid being associated with her ex-husband's debts. She is the mother of Charlene (Kylie Minogue) and Henry (Craig McLachlan). Madge's childhood sweetheart, Harold Bishop, (Ian Smith), was later introduced to Neighbours and he and Madge were later married. Charleston quit Neighbours in 1992, but when she suffered financial difficulties, she returned in 1996. She quit the serial once again in 2001.

Mike Young

Mike Young, played by Guy Pearce, made his first screen appearance on 20 January 1986. Pearce auditioned for the role of Mike and immediately impressed casting director Jan Russ. Pearce joined the soap on 3 December 1985, three days after he finished his last HSC exam. He commented "I moved to Melbourne over the weekend and started Neighbours on the Tuesday. It was crazy. It was the whole, 'Say the words and don't bump into the furniture' thing. I had no idea what I was doing." Patrick Barkham from The Guardian called Mike "nice-but-lonely". While David Astle from The Sydney Morning Herald described Mike as "mullet-mopped" and "hunky."

Clive Gibbons

Clive Gibbons, played by Geoff Paine, made his first appearance on 21 January 1986. A representative from The Grundy Organisation discovered Paine acting in a college production at the Victoria Arts Centre and asked him to do a screen test, before offering him the role of Clive. Clive was a doctor who ran a gorillagram agency. He brought a "breath of fresh air to Ramsay Street" when he moved in. Josephine Monroe, author of Neighbours: The First 10 Years, described Clive as being "one of life's eccentrics" who took care of people and often lured them into his latest harebrained scheme. Clive became so popular with viewers that a pilot for his own show called City Hospital was made, although it was not picked up by any television networks.

Nikki Dennison

Nikki Dennison, played by Charlene Fenn, made her first screen appearance on 28 January 1986. A representative from the Grundy Organisation discovered Fenn at a National Theatre workshop. She auditioned while studying for her HSC exams and was cast as Helen Daniels' (Anne Haddy) niece, Nikki. Of her reaction to winning the role, Fenn told Kelly Bourne of TV Week: "I was six feet off the ground when I first heard, but now I'm down to about two feet." Nikki was Fenn's first television role and she admitted to feeling "a bit apprehensive", but the cast had been friendly and helpful to her. Nikki "casually" enters the show during one of her visits to Helen and the Robinsons. Fenn explained her character's fictional backstory to Bourne, saying "Nikki originally came from a small Queensland town, but she attends a boarding school in Melbourne. Her mother is Helen Daniels' (Anne Haddy) sister, so sometimes Nikki spends weekends with the Robinsons." Bourne thought the situation seemed simple, but for Nikki it was more complicated. Fenn stated "Nikki's widowed mother works in a bar to send her to a good boarding school. But Nikki doesn't really appreciate this because she feels her mum has forced her into a position where she has to lie to be accepted by other girls." This leads to Nikki putting on airs and graces during the week, while she is a fun and normal teenager at the weekends. Fenn thought the two sides to Nikki made her a more interesting character to play. She preferred "the real Nikki", who does not have to impress anyone and can be genuine and fun. Fenn continued, "She can be quite charming when she's with the people she loves – the people who she knows love her simply for herself." Fenn was not keen on boarding school version of Nikki, as she has elements of bitchiness, snobbery, and social climbing. Fenn left Neighbours less than a year after she arrived and she commented "I never thought I was going to be employed in this for the rest of my life."

Nikki was raised by her mother, Laura Dennison (Carole Skinner), in Queensland. Her father, Tom, died when she was young and Nikki became spoilt as Laura gave her everything she wanted. Laura found it hard to deal with Nikki when she became a teenager and decided to send her to Erinsborough to stay with her aunt Helen. Nikki becomes good friends with Charlene Mitchell (Kylie Minogue) and she begins dating Mike Young (Guy Pearce), after he defends her from Sue Parker's (Kate Gorman) rumours. When Lucy Robinson (Kylie Flinker) wins a dinner date with Grant Kenny, Nikki tells her that her father will not let her go on the date and that Grant would not want to have dinner with a child. Nikki manages to persuade Lucy that she should go on the date instead and she gives her some money. Nikki does not tell Helen about the date and lies that she is spending the night studying with a friend. The date with Grant does not go well and he leaves after the main course. Nikki brags to Sue that she had a great night and that she kissed Grant. She also tells her that Grant is going to call her about a second date. However, Nikki's lies are exposed when a photo of herself and Grant appears in a newspaper. Mike then threatens to end their relationship. When Nikki hears that her mother has been diagnosed with multiple sclerosis, she leaves Erinsborough to be with her. When she returns a few months later, Nikki expects to pick up her relationship with Mike, but she soon learns that he is dating Jane Harris (Annie Jones). Nikki tells Jane that she wants Mike back. However, Mike tells her that he is not interested in a relationship with her. Nikki decides to leave Erinsborough permanently to spend time with her mother in the United States.

Rosemary Daniels

Rosemary Daniels, played by Joy Chambers, made her first screen appearance on 20 February 1986. Rosemary is the only character who has always been in the show, although only on a recurring basis. A writer for the official Neighbours website described Rosemary as being "ruthless", while a Holy Soap reporter called a "tough businesswoman". A notable storyline for the character, saw her become engaged to Gerard Singer (Bryan Marshall) and then learn that he was having an affair with her mother Helen Daniels (Anne Haddy). Chambers returned to Neighbours from 6 July 2010 as part of the show's 25th anniversary.

Laura Dennison

Laura Dennison, played by Carole Skinner, made her first screen appearance on 21 March 1986. Laura is Helen Daniels' (Anne Haddy) sister. A picture of Laura sat on Helen's sideboard for years after her last appearance. Laura is also Nikki Dennison's (Charlene Fenn) mother. After she was widowed, Laura began working in a bar to help pay for Nikki's boarding school fees.

Laura's sister, Helen, invites her to Erinsborough for a holiday. Nikki refuses to spend any time with her mother and calls her an embarrassment when Laura flirts with Max Ramsay (Francis Bell). Laura is delighted when Max invites her to dinner and the evening goes well, until Max's son and sister return home. Laura goes back to Helen's and talks to Nikki about her attitude. Nikki chooses to leave her school and move in with Helen. Laura tells her sister that she is going back to her home town and just before she leaves, Nikki realises that she loves her mother and they reunite. They then spend the day repairing their relationship. Laura tells Max that she hopes they will remain friends before leaving. Helen goes to visit Laura and discovers that she has been diagnosed with multiple sclerosis. Nikki then returns home to care for her mother.

A few months later, Laura and Nikki return. Laura finds Nikki's over-protectiveness of her a little overwhelming and she arranges for Nikki to take part in an exchange programme in America, but Nikki refuses to go. Laura spills tea on herself and Helen begins to think that her sister cannot be left on her own. When Helen's friend, Grace Barnett (Marijke Mann), comes to Erinsborough, Laura realises that Helen is not aware that Grace had a one-night stand with her late husband, Bill. Laura convinces Grace to leave town, but when Helen matches her handwriting to a note left with some flowers on Bill's grave, Laura is forced to tell Helen the truth about Grace and Bill. Helen asks Laura to move out, but she soon realises that throwing her sister out is wrong and apologises. Laura takes up jogging and begins working some shifts at The Waterhole. Nikki asks her mother to slow down and Clive Gibbons (Geoff Paine) arranges for a counsellor to talk to her. Nikki later arranges for Laura to go to the United States and she joins her after her exams.

Jack Lassiter

Jack Lassiter, played by Alan Hopgood, made his first screen appearance on 9 April 1986. Hopgood was well known for his role as Wally in Prisoner, by the time he was cast in Neighbours. Jack was introduced as the owner of Lassiter's Hotel and the local pub, The Waterhole, which have been central to storylines throughout the show's history. He departed on 27 June 1986.

On 8 August 2013, it was announced that Hopgood had reprised his role for a month long guest appearance. Hopgood was reunited with co-star Stefan Dennis and he commented "I thoroughly enjoyed returning to the set. In some ways things hadn't changed and others it was very different which made it interesting. It didn't take long at all the settle back in, everyone made me feel very welcome. It was terrific working with Stefan again who is so professional and I also enjoyed working with the new cast." Hopgood regrew his character's moustache for his return. The actor told Lawrence Money from WAtoday that Jack "is wealthy, slightly eccentric and was married off but, several divorces later, he's back and wanting to do something charitable with this money." Jack came back to Erinsborough to "reconcile with his past actions" by giving away some of his fortune. Jack returned on 27 August.

Former gold prospector Jack Lassiter moved to Erinsborough with his wife, Addie, and bought the local hotel, naming it Lassiter's. He also created The Waterhole pub. Jack lived in a caravan by the lake, when Addie died, Jack retreated into himself. Paul Robinson (Dennis) becomes desperate to buy Lassiter's and pays Andrea Townsend (Gina Gaigalas) to try and convince Jack to sell to him. Jack realises what Paul has done and gets his own back by telling Paul that he will sell, only to change his mind a week later. Jack grows close to Andrea, but her son, Bradley (Bradley Kilpatrick), does not like the relationship. When he acts up, Jack smacks Bradley and Andrea throws him out. He later apologises and explains to Bradley that he will not come between him and his mother. Jack tells Andrea about his feelings for her and proposes. Andrea accepts, but confesses to Jack that while she cares for him, she does not love him. Jack does not mind, saying that he will settle for being liked. Jack tells Andrea that he wants to move to the outback, but realising that Andrea is unhappy with the plan, he tells her that they will be going to Paris after the wedding and then they will travel around Europe. While Jack does not feel ready to sell his hotel, he asks Paul to manage it for six months. Jack later contacts the Daniels Corporation from Europe and tells Paul and Rosemary Daniels (Joy Chambers) that he is ready to sell them the hotel.

Jack returns to Erinsborough twenty-seven years later. He goes to Charlie's bar and reminisces about how it used to be called The Waterhole. He then proceeds to Lassiter's Hotel, where he asks Terese Willis (Rebekah Elmaloglou) for his favourite room. Terese gets him the room and then learns that Jack is the man who started the Lassiter's empire. Jack reacquaints himself with Paul again and recognises that he is lonely. Jack acquaints himself with Susan Kennedy (Jackie Woodburne), the principal of the local high school, and helps her to get the radio station up and running again. Jack also helps Josh Willis (Harley Bonner) to organise a series of treasure hunts for the local community, using his money for the prizes. Jack continues to worry about Paul and his lack of friends and family. Jack collapses from a heart attack and Georgia Brooks (Saskia Hampele) saves his life. When Jack returns to Lassiter's, Paul learns that he cannot pay his bill. Jack informs Paul that he has given away all his money as he has an inoperable brain aneurysm. Jack gives Paul the location of the last treasure hunt prize, so he can pay his bill, but Paul pays the bill himself. Jack leaves Erinsborough and dies a few weeks later.

Charlene Mitchell

Charlene Mitchell, played by Kylie Minogue, made her first screen appearance on 17 April 1986. Minogue was originally signed to appear in Neighbours for one week, but this was then extended to 13 weeks and later through to mid-1988. Minogue thought viewers liked her character as she was portrayed as an average Australian teenager, experiencing a difficult relationship with her mother. Charlene was "a bit of a rebel", outspoken and tomboyish.
The character's style often consisted of khaki overalls, baggy sweatshirts and her hair set in a perm. Both Charlene and Minogue became popular with viewers in Australia and Britain. The character had a highly publicised relationship with Scott Robinson (Jason Donovan).

Nell Mangel

Nell Mangel, played by Vivean Gray, made her first screen appearance on 29 April 1986. The character was originally supposed to appear in Neighbours for three weeks. However, the character proved popular with viewers and she became a permanent member of the cast. The character was rarely addressed by her Christian name and was referred to as Mrs Mangel. Dave Hogan and Neil Wallis described Mrs Mangel as being "frosty and disliked by the residents of Ramsay Street." The character was well known for being an interfering busy body and she developed a rivalry with neighbour, Madge Mitchell (Anne Charleston). A reporter from The Scotsman though Gray made more of an impact in her time on Neighbours than some actors make in their entire careers. They added that Mrs Mangel was "one of the most detestable villains ever to set foot in Ramsay Street."

Tom Ramsay

Tom Ramsay, played by Gary Files, made his first appearance on 12 May 1986. After Francis Bell left his role as Max Ramsay, Files was signed up to play Max's younger brother, Tom, who covered the rest of Max's storylines. Files had one day's notice before he started filming his scenes. There was no time to rewrite the scripts and Tom just moved in with his sister and her children. Files stated: "All we did was cross out Max in the scripts and put in Tom. In places I had to ad lib as I went along." Tom was described as being "a carbon copy" of Max by Josephine Monroe, author of The Neighbours Programme Guide. She quipped that he took over Max's house, business and "evidently also his wardrobe of overalls and dungarees". The author also called him a "blustering fool". A critic for the Reading Evening Post called Tom "a bit of a rough diamond". Tom departed on 1 February 1991. A writer for the BBC's Neighbours website said Tom's most notable moment was "Confronting Matt Robinson after Gemma's motorcycle accident." Files reprised his role for Neighbours 30th anniversary in March 2015. Tom returns for his great-nephew Daniel Robinson's (Tim Phillipps) wedding and helps solve the mystery of a missing heirloom.

Tom comes to Erinsborough to take over his brother, Max's plumbing business. He moves in with his sister, Madge (Anne Charleston), in Ramsay Street. Madge and Tom constantly argue with each other, especially when Tom announces that he wants to sell Number 24 to a property developer. Tom is set to go ahead with the sale until Madge convinces him that it is the Ramsay family home. Tom recognises Mike Young's (Guy Pearce) potential as a swimmer and begins training him. However, Tom's nephew, Danny (David Clencie), begins to feel left out and asks him to teach him how to play golf. However, Tom concentrates on training Mike and fails to recognise that he is neglecting Danny. Tom begins dating Jean Richards (Margot Knight) and she later introduces him to her husband, Jeff (Paul Young), a quadriplegic who encourages her to be with Tom. When Tom eventually proposes to Jean, she turns him down. Jean is later killed in a car accident, which devastates Tom. Her death is made more painful, as Tom's nephew, Shane (Peter O'Brien) was driving. Tom's mother, Edna (Jessica Noad), comes to visit and she reveals that his estranged daughter, Moira, has given birth to a daughter. Tom, unaware that Moira had been pregnant, is surprised and decides to get in touch with Moira. He later goes to live with Moira in Queensland. He briefly returns to Ramsay Street to visit Madge and his daughter, Gemma (Beth Buchanan). Tom's visit is stressful as Gemma had recently been involved in a motorbike accident and Tom confronts Gemma's boyfriend, Matt Robinson (Ashley Paske), the owner of the bike. Tom returns to Queensland soon after.

Years later, Tom returns to Erinsborough for his great-nephew Daniel's wedding to Amber Turner (Jenna Rosenow). He comes across Imogen Willis (Ariel Kaplan) looking at a picture of Agnes Robinson, and tells her how everyone tried to find her engagement ring after she threw it down a well. Tom then goes to see Daniel. He leaves after the wedding is cancelled.

Sue Parker

Sue Parker, played by Kate Gorman, made her first screen appearance on 9 June 1986. Gorman appeared on Neighbours for two years. In their book, The Neighbours Factfile, Neil Wallis and Dave Hogan, describe Sue as being "bitchy". A notable storyline for the character saw her play "a cruel practical joke" on Mike Young (Guy Pearce) and Scott Robinson (Jason Donovan). Sue never got over Mike preferring Jane Harris (Annie Jones) to her and vowed to get even. When Sue heard that Mike and Scott had written a song and sent it to Molly Meldrum, she called them up, pretending to be Molly's secretary, and invited them to come and sing the song in front of Molly. Mike and Scott soon discovered it was a hoax and Sue publicly gloated about what happened. Gorman returned as Sue in July 2014. Michael Cregan from Inside Soap commented "This is the best and most unexpected soap return ever!"

In 2017, Johnathon Hughes of Digital Spy included Sue in his "7 of the most evil mean girls in soap" list. Of the character, Hughes stated "In the '80s, surly Sue and her daggy side-parting was a total bullying beeyach to Charlene (she tried to split up her and Scott, which is completely unforgivable) and her best mate Jane Harris (or "Plain Jane Superbrain" to give the girl her full title). In one memorable scene, mousy Jane finally thumped her and we all cheered." Gorman returned to filming in late 2017, and made her on-screen return as Sue on 7 February 2018.

Sue spreads malicious rumours about Nikki Dennison (Charlene Fenn) and develops a crush on Mike Young. Sue is not happy when Mike begins dating Jane Harris and she sends poison pen letters about Mike to Nell Mangel (Vivean Gray), hoping that she will stop Jane from seeing Mike, but Daphne Lawrence (Elaine Smith) catches her. Jane later punches Sue and her friends cover for her. Sue tells her father,  Bill (Mark Allen) that it was a gang attack and he threatens to sue all four parties involved. However, Jane owns up to punching Sue and explains about the letters. Sue admits to exaggerating her story and her father backs down. Sue remains bitter about Mike choosing Jane over her and she decides to play a joke on him and Scott Robinson. Sue pretends to be Molly Meldrum's, secretary and tells Mike and Scott that Molly heard the demo they sent in and wants to see them in person. The joke backfires on Sue when Molly meets with Mike and Scott and praises their song.

Sue causes Scott and Charlene Mitchell's (Kylie Minogue) break up, when she tells Scott that Charlene and Warren Murphy (Ben Mendelsohn) kissed. When Sue overhears Scott has written some formulas on his arms to cheat in an exam, she tells Mr White (Douglas Bennett), who confronts Scott. But Scott has already washed off the writing, leaving Sue looking like a liar. After they leave school, Sue become a trainee at the local bank. She runs into Scott and apologises for being rough on him at school. Sue dates Charlene's brother, Henry Ramsay (Craig McLachlan), which upsets Charlene. Sue tries to prove to her that she has changed. She later moves into a caravan with Charlene, but the pair do not get along. When Henry is arrested for robbery, Sue offers to give him a false alibi. Warren warns Sue not to lie for Henry, explaining that she could lose her job, and she agrees not to. Sue begins staying at Warren's place, and when the caravan burns down, she continues to stay there, which annoys Henry. He asks Sue to move in with him, threatening to break up with her if she does not. Sue refuses and leaves with Warren.

Twenty-seven years later, Sue comes into regular contact with Scott's brother Paul (Stefan Dennis) through her job as an Erinsborough councillor. When Sue's son, Jayden (Khan Oxenham), buys a skateboard from Josh Willis (Harley Bonner), and then injures himself trying to recreate a stunt he had seen Josh performing, Sue threatens to sue Josh. Scott and Charlene's son, Daniel Robinson (Tim Phillipps) speaks to Sue and reminds her of the poison pen letters she sent and the rest of the bad things she did when she was a teenager. Sue agrees to drop the case. When Paul is suspended from his job as mayor, Sue is voted in as interim mayor. When Paul arranges an event at the local plant nursery, to announce that he is ready to take up his job again, the nursery is trashed by Jayden. Paul forces a confession out of him and when Sue learns what her son did, she steps down as interim mayor, so Paul will not press charges against Jayden. Sue later berates Paul for using community service workers to clear out The Waterhole's office. When Sue's husband Bill Warley (Darren Mort) sees an old photo of Sue and Paul kissing, he realises that she had an affair while they were dating and he punches Paul. Sue and Paul reminisce about that day, and Sue apologises for Bill's actions.

When Paul starts missing council meetings, Sue becomes suspicious and visits his penthouse to find out what is going on. Sue suggests that Paul is no longer up to the job and he tells her to leave. She spots some anti-nausea pills on her way out and tries to find out more information from Karl Kennedy (Alan Fletcher). Paul then calls a council meeting and announces that he has leukaemia. Weeks later, Sue attends a friend's birthday party and propositions Josh after watching his dance routine. Josh declines her offer. Naomi Canning (Morgana O'Reilly) applies for an events job with the council, but Sue refuses to consider her application as she is in a relationship with Paul. Naomi learns about Josh and blackmails Sue, who lets her organise the launch party for the new childcare centre. Sue sabotages Susan Kennedy (Jackie Woodburne) and Brad Willis' (Kip Gamblin) chances of saving Erinsborough High from closure. She is later fired from her job when it emerges she accepted a bribe from Paul to get his housing estate plans approved quickly.

A couple of years later, Sue learns Paul is taking over a half-finished housing development. She tells him that the original owners of the development underpaid the mostly elderly home owners who were already there. Sue points out that if that information becomes public knowledge, then Paul's housing development will be tainted. She agrees to keep quiet, but only if Paul gives Jayden a job on the development. Paul gets his daughter Amy Williams (Zoe Cramond) to hire Jayden at her builders yard. The truth about the home owners being underpaid is leaked to the press, and Paul assumes Sue is responsible, but she denies it. Rafael Humphreys (Ryan Thomas) overhears Sue talking about Paul, and they team up to discredit Paul's reputation and the housing development. Sue asks Jayden to loosen the ratchet straps on a truck carrying concrete slabs, so they will fall off. Leo Tanaka (Tim Kano) is injured by the falling slabs, and Sue and Jayden's involvement in the accident is revealed. They receive a six-month prison sentence each.

Jane Harris

Jane Harris, played by Annie Jones, made her first on-screen appearance on 31 July 1986. Jones spent two months ringing the Neighbours production company asking for a role on the show. She said "I had appeared on several other Australian TV shows, but desperately wanted to get into Neighbours". Jones originally auditioned for the role of Charlene Mitchell, before she was given the small role of Jane, for what was a planned six weeks of appearances. Jane was Nell Mangel's (Vivean Gray) granddaughter. She was very clever and was often bullied at school. The character received the nickname of "Plain Jane Superbrain". For her portrayal of Jane, Jones won the 1989 Most Popular Actress Logie Award.

Sam Cole

Sam Cole made his first screen appearance on 31 July 1986. Sam was originally played by Scott Wealands until the role was taken over by Thomas Hamston. Sam became the second baby to appear in Neighbours.

Susan Cole (Gloria Ajenstat) gives birth to Sam while she is having an affair with Fred Mitchell (Nick Waters), her boss and a married man. When Fred throws Susan and Sam out, Susan goes to Erinsborough. Susan contacts Sam's half-sister, Charlene Mitchell (Kylie Minogue) when she falls ill and Charlene takes Sam home with her. Charlene tells her mother, Madge (Anne Charleston), that Sam is her child and Madge begins to bond with him. Susan eventually comes to collect Sam, but she collapses and Madge lets her and Sam stay for a while. Susan and Sam later move in with Clive Gibbons (Geoff Paine). Clive bonds with Sam and enjoys having him in his life. Susan begins an affair with Paul Robinson (Stefan Dennis). When he ends their affair, Susan realises how much Clive loves her and Sam and they begin dating.

When Clive proposes to Susan in the street, she lets go of Sam's pram to take the ring. The pram rolls down the street and into the road. An oncoming car containing Paul, Scott Robinson (Jason Donovan) and Mike Young (Guy Pearce) has to swerve to avoid hitting Sam and he is recovered by Susan. Susan agrees to marry Clive as she believes that he will be a better father to Sam than Paul. Susan realises that she does not love Clive and she and Sam leave. A few days later, Susan tells Charlene that she has left Sam's favourite teddy bear at Clive's house and asks her to collect it for him. Clive comes to see Susan and she leaves Sam with him, while she says goodbye to Paul. Clive tells Sam to eat his pumpkin and to enjoy life. Susan and Sam then leave for Coffs Harbour.

Susan Cole

Susan Cole, played by Gloria Ajenstat, made her first screen appearance on 11 August 1986. During her time in the show, Susan moved onto Ramsay Street and developed a romance with Clive Gibbons (Geoff Paine). In November 1986, Stephen Cook from TV Week reported that Ajenstat would be leaving Neighbours early the following year. Neighbours producer Phil East explained that Ajenstat was simply leaving when her contract came up for renewal. A writer for the BBC's Neighbours website said Susan's most notable moment was "Chasing her son's pram down a hill just as it went into the path of Paul Robinson's car – causing it to crash." Fergus Shiel from The Sydney Morning Herald branded Susan "sultry."

Susan has an affair with Fred Mitchell (Nick Waters), while she works for him and his wife, Madge (Anne Charleston), at their hardware shop. When Madge catches them together, she leaves Fred. Susan and Fred's relationship becomes strained after Susan discovers she is pregnant. She gives birth to a son, who she names Frederick Samuel "Sam" Cole (Scott Wealands; Thomas Hamston). Fred does not want the responsibility of another child and ends the relationship with Susan.

Susan comes to Erinsborough to see Fred's daughter, Charlene (Kylie Minogue), who she is quite close to. Susan gets an infection and has to be hospitalised, so she calls Charlene for help. Charlene takes Sam home with her and lies to Madge that he is her son. Madge eventually accepts Sam as her grandson, but she is shocked when Susan arrives in Ramsay Street for him. An argument breaks out and Susan collapses in Madge's living room. Madge agrees to let her stay the night, but after learning that Fred had left Susan and Sam, she lets them stay with her until Susan recovers from her illness. Clive Gibbons offers Susan a room at his house and she accepts, she also gets a job as Paul Robinson's (Stefan Dennis) secretary. Susan and Paul begin an affair, which upsets Clive as he had fallen in love with Susan. Susan agrees to pose as Clive's wife when his uncle comes to stay, so Clive can appear as a happily married man. The plan fails when Clive's uncle sees Susan kissing Paul. After Paul and Susan's relationship ends, she realises that Clive loves her and she starts dating him. When she is out walking Sam one day, Clive proposes to a shocked Susan. Susan agrees to marry him, but she lets go of Sam's pram to take the ring and it rolls down the street and into the path of the traffic. Paul, Scott Robinson (Jason Donovan) and Mike Young (Guy Pearce) have to swerve their car to avoid hitting Sam, who is recovered by Susan. Susan realises that she does not love Clive and that she is only marrying him for security. She decides to leave him before they marry and leaves Clive a note apologising for leaving. Susan gets in touch with Charlene to ask her to get Sam's favourite teddy, which she had left behind. Clive catches Charlene and begs her to let him know where Susan is. Charlene arranges a meeting between him and Susan, and Susan apologises for leaving him. She then flies home to Coffs Harbour.

Dan Ramsay

Dan Ramsay, played by Syd Conabere, made his first screen appearance on 26 August 1986. The character arrived in Erinsborough after being thrown out by his wife, Edna (Jessica Noad). Josephine Monroe, author of The Neighbours Programme Guide, quipped that it was apparent where Dan's sons Max (Francis Bell) and Tom (Gary Files) got their "pig-headedness" from and thought he was worse than both of them put together. When Edna found out that she and Dan were not legally married, Monroe thought it was due to Dan's "typical incompetence". Dan and Edna, who were on the brink of separating for good, were eventually married and they headed back to Brisbane. A writer for the BBC's Neighbours website said Dan's most notable moment was "Marrying his wife of 50 years after their original marriage was shown to be invalid!" In her book, Neighbours: the first 10 years, Josephine Monroe said Dan and Edna's wedding was one of the "most moving" and simplest ceremonies.

Dan was born in Erinsborough, but he moved to Brisbane to find work. He met and married Edna Wilkins and they had three children; Max, Tom and Madge (Anne Charleston). Dan was happy when Madge began dating Harold Bishop (Ian Smith), but he was left shocked when she married Fred Mitchell (Nick Waters) and moved to Coff's Harbour. After the marriage ends, Madge moves to Ramsay Street, which had been named after Dan's father, Jack. Dan soon follows Madge after Edna throws him out for flirting with another woman. Dan takes an instant dislike to Clive Gibbons (Geoff Paine) after he almost drives over Dan's suitcase. Dan fakes a heart scare and Clive mentions he is a doctor, which prompts Dan to recover quickly. Dan makes sure that all the neighbours know about his family's history and he clashes with the Robinson family. Dan's granddaughter, Charlene (Kylie Minogue), is thrilled that he is staying, but Tom is not and he refuses to let his father stay with him. However, Dan insists on staying. He later harasses Madge at The Waterhole for free drinks, but refuses to tell her why he had left Edna on her own. Tom discovers that Edna is staying with Max and Madge invites her to Erinsborough. Edna is not happy to see Dan and they barely tolerate each other. Dan tries to wind Edna up by talking about a date he had arranged with Helen Daniels (Anne Haddy). Tom and Dan start to heal their rift by shaking hands.

Dan goes to dinner with Helen, but is unaware that she, Madge and Clive had come up with a plan to reunite him with Edna. Helen pretends to be rude and disagreeable, but Dan finds Helen even more attractive. Dan takes Helen to his home and Edna appears and asks for a divorce. Clive tells Dan that he is taking Edna on a date, which makes Dan jealous. Edna discovers that their marriage was never legal because Dan had got a cheap minister, who was actually a con artist, to marry them. Dan is shocked by the revelation and Edna accuses Dan of causing her to live in sin for years. They talk about their lives, but when Edna asks for a second chance, Dan tells her that it is too late for them to start over. Clive, Charlene, Madge and Shane (Peter O'Brien) hatch a plan to get Dan and Edna together again. They make the couple nostalgic for the old days and Dan asks Edna to marry him. Dan and Edna get married in a small private ceremony in front of Madge, Charlene, Clive and Shane. Dan then takes Edna to Surfer's Paradise for their honeymoon. Dan continues to cause rows with the Robinson family when he comes to visit Ramsay Street. Scott Robinson (Jason Donovan) discovers that Ramsay Street should have been named after the Robinsons, which disgusts Dan. Dan's ire is further provoked when Todd (Kristian Schmid) and Katie Landers (Sally Jensen) change the street sign to Robinson Street. He then organises a card game between Scott and Henry Ramsay (Craig McLachlan) and asks Charlene to fix the cards, so that Henry will win. Henry wins, even after Scott asks for the cards to be checked. Dan later suffers a heart attack in Brisbane and he is forced to miss Madge's wedding to Harold. A few months later, he offers a house to Charlene and Scott in Brisbane and they later name their son, Daniel, after him.

Ruth Wilson

Ruth Wilson, played by Stephanie Daniel, made her first screen appearance on 1 September 1986. Ruth was an Englishwoman who was introduced as a love interest for widower Jim Robinson (Alan Dale). Ruth and Jim "got on like a house on fire" and when she suffered money troubles, Jim invited Ruth to come and stay with him and his family. Josephine Monroe, author of The Neighbours Programme Guide, believed Ruth was just another in "a long line of Ramsay Street swindlers".

While he is flying home from a business trip, Jim Robinson falls asleep on Ruth's shoulder. He and Ruth begin to talk and he learns that she is going to stay in Erinsborough. Ruth accepts when Jim asks her out to dinner. When Jim comes to pick Ruth up, he discovers that she is not able to pay her hotel bill. Ruth finds out that her London accountant has stolen her money, leaving her penniless. She also realises that she will be unable to return to her two children back in England. Jim's son, Paul (Stefan Dennis), refuses to help Ruth out, so Jim pays Ruth's bill and asks her to stay with him. Ruth is grateful to Jim and assures him that she will pay him back. Ruth befriends Jim's daughter, Lucy (Kylie Flinker), and his mother-in-law, Helen (Anne Haddy), but worries that she is outstaying her welcome. Ruth decides to sell a ring in order to pay Jim back, but he refuses to take the money. Jim then insists that she can stay as long as she needs to. Helen begins to resent having Ruth around after Ruth discovers that Lucy is faking an illness to get out of going to school. However, she admits that she is glad Jim has found someone who makes him happy.

Ruth gets a bank loan, but does not tell Jim straight away. She later confesses that she was stalling because she did not want to leave him and his family. Ruth makes plans to return home, but Jim asks her to stay and they kiss. Ruth then decides to move back to Lassiter's, so the family can get used to their relationship. After a family dinner, Ruth is invited to move back in. She is flattered when Ted Gibbons (Max Meldrum) pays her some attention and when he reveals that he is going to visit England, Ruth suggests that they meet up. Jim admits that he does not love Ruth, but that he cares for her. Ruth tells Jim that she wants to return home in time for Christmas, but this upsets Lucy. After Lucy is recovered from a storm drain, she suffers from hysterical blindness and Ruth agrees to stay and look after her. Ruth explains that she will leave once Lucy's sight returns, but Paul is adamant that Ruth needs to leave. Ruth then decides to leave the following morning, which devastates Lucy, so she agrees to delay her flight. Lucy's sight returns and though she initially tries to keep it a secret, she tells Ruth, who organises a flight home. Ruth gives Lucy her jewellery box and Lucy gives Ruth her favourite book. Ruth thanks Jim for everything and she leaves.

Edna Ramsay

Edna Ramsay, played by Jessica Noad (1915–2002), made her first screen appearance on 2 September 1986. Edna follows her husband Dan (Syd Conabere) to Erinsborough, after she kicks him out for flirting with another woman. Edna was very concerned with what the neighbours thought and was embarrassed by Dan. A BBC writer described Edna as having "the patience of a saint" and being generous, they added that she had a "quiet strength." When Edna learned that she and Dan were not legally married, she was "distraught" at having lived in sin for nearly fifty years. Dan tried to make things up to Edna and the couple were married, before leaving for Brisbane. A writer for the BBC's Neighbours website said Edna's most notable moment was "Getting married after 50 years with her partner Dan." In her book, Neighbours: the first 10 years, Josephine Monroe said Dan and Edna's wedding was one of the "most moving" and simplest ceremonies.

Edna met Dan Ramsay at a dance, shortly after she left school. They married and had three children; Max (Francis Bell), Tom (Gary Files) and Madge (Anne Charleston). Edna was proud of Madge for dating Harold Bishop (Ian Smith), as she adored him. However, Edna was shocked when Madge then married Fred Mitchell (Nick Waters). Edna had feared the marriage would end in divorce and she was proven right a few years later. When Edna caught Dan flirting with another woman she threw him out and he went to stay with Madge and Tom in Erinsborough. Tom contacts Max and he reveals that Edna is staying with him. Madge then invites her mother to Erinsborough and tells her that Dan had gone. Edna is not happy when she finds Dan is still in town and Edna orders her daughter to decide who she wants to stay. Madge refuses to choose and Edna and Dan agree to tolerate each other. Dan tries to wind Edna up when he reveals that he has a date with Helen Daniels (Anne Haddy). Edna ignores him and tells Tom about his new granddaughter instead. Dan brings Helen home and Edna calls her a jezebel, before asking Dan for a divorce.

Edna takes up aerobics and tells Madge that she is going to enjoy her life without Dan. Clive Gibbons (Geoff Paine) suggests that Edna make Dan jealous by taking a man to dinner. Edna chooses to take Clive, which makes Dan furious. Edna has a good time with Clive and she tells him about how things changed between her and Dan. Edna goes to see a divorce lawyer and is shocked when she learns that her marriage had never been legal. Dan refuses to accept any blame, when Edna tells him that it was his fault. Edna accuses him of causing her to live in sin, but asks what they should do next. Dan and Edna talk about old times and when Edna suggests they give their marriage another go, Dan dismisses her. Clive comes up with a plan to reunite Dan and Edna, but making them nostalgic for the old days. Dan asks Edna to marry him and she agrees. Dan and Edna get married in a small private ceremony and go to Surfer's Paradise for their honeymoon. Edna is delighted when Madge finally agrees to marry Harold and just before the wedding, she takes him aside and gives him a warning to take care of her daughter. She then watches Madge and Harold marry.

Warren Murphy

Warren Murphy, played by Ben Mendelsohn, made his first screen appearance on 13 October 1986. Mendelsohn won the role of Warren when he was seventeen. He commented "I only did Neighbours for 6 weeks – it was actually, The Year My Voice Broke, and then I did 6 weeks on Neighbours, such is the life of the odd actor trying to make a buck." Mendelsohn befriended Kylie Minogue and Jason Donovan, who had become very popular with viewers, and he described the attention they received as "hectic". Mendelsohn told The Guardian's Alex Godfrey that he did not want that level of fame, saying "I felt like a participant plenty enough. Within the circle of people I was working with, I was fairly well regarded, in my own way. So no, it was fun and silly, but I didn't look on with shades of green."

Warren begins studying for his HSC with Charlene Mitchell (Minogue) and Scott Robinson (Donovan). Warren struggles to get through a study session without drinking a bottle of wine, which does not impress Scott, but Charlene joins in. Warren's father, Ray Murphy (Norman Yemm), advises him to cut down, but does not appear too concerned. Warren spends the night at his father's house and he admits that his mother is not happy about it. Warren also admits that he finds it difficult being caught between his parents. Ray tells Warren not to worry and gives him some money, which Warren spends on wine. A fellow student throws a party, which Warren and Charlene attend together. Sue Parker (Kate Gorman) notices Warren's alcohol problem and she also calls Scott to tell him that Charlene and Warren kissed, causing them to break up.

The following day, Charlene has trouble remembering what happened and is surprised when Ray turns up and reveals Warren is unconscious after being beaten up. At the hospital, Charlene admits to the police that cannot remember the night before, which angers Ray. He learns that Warren and Charlene went to another party and almost gets physical with Charlene, until Charlene's cousin, Shane Ramsay (Peter O'Brien) intervenes. Warren wakes up and explains that while he and Charlene were at a party on Waratah Street, some guys began hassling Charlene and he told them to back off, which they did not like. After Warren took Charlene home, the guys attacked him. Warren points out that the situation is not Charlene's fault, but Ray throws her out of the hospital. When Ray collects Warren from the hospital, Warren tells him that he drinks to help him cope with his parents' divorce and the upcoming exams. Ray does not initially take his son seriously, but Warren confesses that he needs to have a few drinks just to get through the day. Both Warren and Ray vow to give up alcohol completely. When Warren learns that Sue has offered to give her boyfriend, Henry Ramsay (Craig McLachlan), a false alibi, following his arrest for robbery, he warns her not to. He explains that she could lose her job and Sue changes her mind. Sue begins staying at Warren's place and he develops feelings for her. When Sue refuses to move in with Henry, they break up and Sue leaves with Warren.

Others

References

Bibliography

External links
 Characters and cast at the Official Neighbours website
 Characters and cast at IMDb

1986
, Neighbours
1986 in Australian television